Vittorio Goretti (born 1939 – 7 July 2016) was an Italian amateur astronomer and a discoverer of minor planets at his observatory in Pianoro, on the outskirts of Bologna, Italy.

Vittorio Goretti is a retired teacher of physics and mathematics at secondary school level in Bologna.<ref
name="AAC - Goretti"/> He has discovered 32 main-belt asteroids, all of them assigned permanent numbers. He is a member of the Cortina Astronomical Association (Associazione Astronomica Cortina) and is also a collaborator with the Minor Planet Center (MPC) at the Smithsonian Astrophysical Observatory monitoring near-Earth Asteroids brighter than magnitude 18.0 V under the auspices of Division III of the International Astronomical Union at his own Pianoro Observatory (MPC Observatory 610).

The main-belt asteroid 7801 Goretti has been named in his honour. The official naming citation was published on 16 October 1997.

List of discovered minor planets

References

External links 
 Vittorio Goretti photograph at Associazione Astronomica Cortina website, accessed 14 April 2011

1939 births
Discoverers of asteroids

20th-century Italian astronomers
2016 deaths